Menghi is a surname. Notable people with the surname include:

Diego Menghi (born 1985), Argentine footballer
Fabio Menghi (born 1986), Italian motorcycle racer
Giovanni Sesto Menghi (1907–1990), Italian painter
Omar Menghi (born 1975), Italian motorcycle racer
Roger Menghi (born 1935), Luxembourgian fencer